Pisa Aeroporto railway station was a railway station within Pisa International Airport, Italy. A shuttle train service operated between it and the nearby main railway station in Pisa, Pisa Centrale railway station, although there were also a few direct services to Florence.

It was closed on 15 December 2013 to make way for the construction of a fully automated people mover, called PisaMover, which operates services to Pisa Centrale every five minutes. PisaMover came into operation in March 2017.

Structure
Consisting of only two platforms, the airport station linked the airport with Pisa Centrale, the main railway station in Pisa, via a  railway line. The station was served mainly by regional rail services, most of them from Pisa Centrale. There were also some regional rail services to the airport from Firenze Santa Maria Novella railway station.

The facility was classified by its owner, Rete Ferroviaria Italiana, as category "Silver".

See also
History of rail transport in Italy
List of railway stations in Tuscany
Rail transport in Italy
Railway stations in Italy

References

External links

 Description and images of the station 

Airport railway stations in Italy
Buildings and structures in Pisa
Railway stations in Tuscany

Railway stations opened in 1983